Herbert Dijkstra (born 13 July 1966) is a Dutch speed skater and sports commentator. He competed in two events at the 1988 Winter Olympics.

References

1966 births
Living people
Dutch male speed skaters
Olympic speed skaters of the Netherlands
Speed skaters at the 1988 Winter Olympics
Sportspeople from Drenthe